Domenici is an Italian surname. Notable people with the surname include:

Leonardo Domenici (born 1955), Italian politician
Pete Domenici (1932–2017), American attorney and politician

See also
Richard DeDomenici, British artist

Italian-language surnames
Patronymic surnames
Surnames from given names